Arthur Ernest "Spider" Jones (1878−1939) was an English professional footballer.

Born in St. Pancras, London, he played for Market Drayton before moving to Tottenham Hotspur in the 1900−01 season in both the Southern League and the Western League. In his time at the club, he played as a forward. Tottenham won the FA Cup final this season, though Jones was not in that lineup.

For the 1901−02 season he moved to Doncaster Rovers who had just been elected to the Football League for the first time. He changed position to centre half and was known there as "Spider" Jones. He scored once in a total of 22 League and FA Cup matches.

References

1878 births
1939 deaths
Footballers from St Pancras, London
English footballers
Association football defenders
Association football forwards
Tottenham Hotspur F.C. players
Doncaster Rovers F.C. players
English Football League players